Björn Kristian Ulvaeus (born 25 April 1945) is a Swedish musician, singer, songwriter, and producer best known as a member of the musical group ABBA. He is also the co-composer of the musicals Chess, Kristina från Duvemåla, and Mamma Mia!  He co-produced the films Mamma Mia! and Mamma Mia! Here We Go Again with fellow ABBA member and close friend Benny Andersson. He is the oldest member of the group.

Early life 
Björn Kristian Ulvaeus was born in Gothenburg on 25 April 1945. In 1951, he moved with his family to Västervik, Kalmar County. His parents were Aina Eliza Viktoria (née Bengtsson; 1909–2005) and Erik Gunnar Ulvaeus (1912–1999). Ulvaeus has one sister, Eva Margareta (born 1948). Ulvaeus studied business and law at Lund University after undertaking his military service, alongside comedian Magnus Holmström.

Career

Pre-ABBA 
Before gaining international recognition with ABBA, Ulvaeus was a member of the Swedish folk-schlager band Hootenanny Singers, known earlier as the "West Bay Singers", who had an enormous following in Scandinavia. While on the road in southern Sweden in 1966, they encountered the Hep Stars, and Ulvaeus quickly became friends with the group's keyboard player, Benny Andersson. The two musicians shared a passion for songwriting, and each found a composing partner in the other. On meeting again that summer, they composed their first song together: "Isn't It Easy To Say", a song soon to be recorded by Andersson's group. The two continued teaming up for music, helping out each other's bands in the recording studio, and adding guitar or keyboards respectively to the recordings. In 1968, they composed two songs together: "A Flower in My Garden", recorded by Hep Stars, and their first real hit "Ljuva Sextiotal", for which Stig Anderson wrote lyrics. The latter, a cabarét-style ironic song about the 1960s, was submitted for the 1969 Swedish heats for the Eurovision Song Contest, but was rejected; it was later recorded by diva Brita Borg. Another hit came in 1969 with "Speleman", also recorded by Hep Stars.

While filming a nostalgic schlager special for television in March 1969, Björn met eighteen-year-old future wife and singer-songwriter Agnetha Fältskog.

Björn Ulvaeus continued recording and touring with Hootenanny Singers to great acclaim while working as in-house producer at Polar Record Company (headed by future manager Stig Anderson), with Benny as his new partner. The twosome produced records by other artists and continued writing songs together. Polar artist Arne Lamberts Swedish version of "A Flower in My Garden" ("Fröken Blåklint") was one of Björn & Benny's first in-house productions. In December 1969, they recorded the new song "She's My Kind of Girl", which became their first single as a duo. It was released in March 1970, giving them a minor hit in Sweden and a top-ten hit in Japan two years later.

The Hootenanny Singers entered Svensktoppen, the Swedish radio charts, in 1970 with "Omkring Tiggarn Från Luossa", a cover of an old folk-schlager song. It remained on the charts for 52 consecutive weeks, a record which endured until 1990; the song was produced by Björn and Benny, and had Ulvaeus's solo vocal and Benny's piano.

ABBA Years

Post-ABBA 
After ABBA went on hiatus in 1982, Ulvaeus and Andersson created the musicals Chess, a collaboration with lyricist Tim Rice, Kristina från Duvemåla (based on The Emigrants novels by Swedish writer Vilhelm Moberg), and Mamma Mia! (based on ABBA songs).

Together with Andersson, Ulvaeus was nominated for the Drama Desk Award in the category "Outstanding Music" (for the musical Chess), and for a Tony Award in a category "Best Orchestrations" (for the musical Mamma Mia!). The original cast recordings for both musicals were nominated for a Grammy Award.

For the 2004 semi-final of the Eurovision Song Contest in Istanbul, thirty years after ABBA had won the 1974 contest in Brighton, UK, Ulvaeus appeared briefly in a special comedy video made for the interval act, entitled "Our Last Video". Each of the four members of the group appeared briefly in cameo roles, as did others such as Cher and Rik Mayall. The video was not included in the official DVD release of the Eurovision Contest, but was issued as a separate DVD release. It was billed as the first time the four had worked together since the group split. In fact, they each filmed their appearances separately.

Ulvaeus also shared with Andersson "The Special International Ivor Novello Award" from the British Academy of Songwriters, Composers and Authors, "The Music Export Prize" from the Swedish Ministry of Industry and Trade (2008), and "Lifetime Achievement Award" from the Swedish Music Publishers Association (SMFF).

On 15 April 2013, it was officially announced by the EBU and the SVT that Ulvaeus and Andersson, with the late Swedish DJ and record producer Avicii, had composed the anthem for the 2013 Eurovision Song Contest. The song was performed for the first time in the Final on 18 May.

Ulvaeus reunited with ABBA in 2018.

In 2019, Ulvaeus worked with Swedish songwriter Andreas Carlsson to arrange an English dub of Tomas Ledin's jukebox musical film En del av mitt hjärta (English: A Piece of My Heart) directed by Edward af Sillén. Ulvaeus was asked to write English lyrics for Ledin's songs as they are long-term friends.

In 2020, Björn Ulvaeus has been appointed President of CISAC, the International Confederation of Societies of Authors and Composers.

On 2 September 2021, via YouTube livestream, ABBA announced their upcoming virtual concert residency  "ABBA Voyage", as well as the imminent release of an eponymous album, recorded between 2017 and 2021. The new record, their first studio album in 40 years, features ten tracks, including "I Still Have Faith In You" and "Don't Shut Me Down", which also were first shown in the aforementioned livestream event and released as a double A-side single. On 5 November 2021, the Voyage album was released worldwide. On 27 May 2022, ABBA Voyage opened in a purpose-built venue named the ABBA Arena at the Queen Elizabeth Olympic Park in London.

Personal life 
On 6 July 1971, Ulvaeus married Agnetha Fältskog. They had two children: Linda Elin Ulvaeus (born 23 February 1973), and Peter Christian Ulvaeus (born 4 December 1977). The couple separated in early 1979, and their divorce was finalised in July 1980. 

Ulvaeus married music journalist Lena Källersjö on 6 January 1981. They have two daughters: Emma Eleonora (born 3 January 1982) and Anna Linnea (born 29 April 1986). Ulvaeus and Källersjö live on a private island in Djursholm, an upscale area in Danderyd municipality north of Stockholm. From 1984 to 1990 they lived in the United Kingdom, where Ulvaeus founded an IT business with his brother. In February 2022, Ulvaeus and Källersjö announced their separation.

Ulvaeus is one of the four owners (along with Per Gessle) of NoteHeads, a Swedish company which publishes the music notation program Igor Engraver.

Ulvaeus is a member of the International Humanist and Ethical Union's Swedish member organisation Humanisterna, and was awarded their annual prize, Hedenius-priset, in 2006. Ulvaeus describes himself as an atheist. He has appeared on several shows discussing his views about religion.

Ulvaeus suffered from severe long-term memory loss. However, in a 2009 interview, he stated that reports of his memory loss were "hugely exaggerated". In a TV interview with Fredrik Skavlan, Ulvaeus said the memory loss pertained to episodic memory. He said that, for instance, he was not nostalgic for his days with ABBA: "It was good while it lasted."

The Guardian called him Sweden's "highest-profile cash-free campaigner", explaining that "after his son was robbed several years ago, Ulvaeus became an evangelist for the electronic payment movement, claiming that cash was the primary cause of crime and that 'all activity in the black economy requires cash'". He has reportedly been living cash-free for more than a year, and ABBA The Museum has operated cash-free since it opened in May 2013.

Tax vindication 
The Swedish Tax Agency accused Björn Ulvaeus of failing to pay 90 million kronor (US$12.8 million) in back taxes for eight years ending in 2005. The agency claimed that he "laundered" his music royalty income through institutions in several foreign countries. Ulvaeus paid the taxes as a precautionary measure during the 2½-year dispute. In October 2008, the county administrative court decided the case in Ulvaeus' favour, ruling that he never owed any of the 90 million kronor.

Discography

Björn solo singles 
 1968: "Raring" (Swedish version of "Honey")/"Vill Du Ha En Vän"
 1968: "Fröken Fredriksson" (Swedish version of "Harper Valley PTA")/"Vår Egen Sång" – (Polar POS 162)
 1969: "Saknar Du Något Min Kära" (Swedish version of "Where Do You Go To (My Lovely)?"/"Gömt Är Inte Glömt")
 1969: "Partaj-Aj-Aj-Aj"/"Kvinnan I Mitt Liv"

Björn and Benny singles 
 1970: "She's My Kind of Girl"/"Inga Theme"
 1970: "Hej Gamle Man!"/"Lycka" (Happiness)
 1971: "Hey, Musikant"/"Was die Liebe sagt"
 1971: "Det Kan Ingen Doktor Hjalpa" (It Can't Be Remedied by a Doctor)/"På Bröllop"
 1971: "Tänk Om Jorden Vore Ung" (If Only We Had The Time)/"Träskofolket"
 1972: "En Karusell" (Merry-Go-Round)/"Att Finnas Till"
 1972: "Love Has Its Ways"/"Rock 'N' Roll Band" (Benny & Björn 1st version)

Björn and Benny albums 
 1970: Lycka
 1984: Chess (concept album with Tim Rice)
 1986: Chess Pieces
 1988: Chess: Original Broadway Cast Recording
 1994: Chess in Concert
 1996: Kristina från Duvemåla
 1998: från Waterloo till Duvemåla
 1999: 16 favoriter ur Kristina från Duvemåla
 1999: Mamma Mia! (Original Cast Recording)
 2000: Mamma Mia! (Original Broadway Cast Recording)
 2002: Chess på Svenska
 2005: Mamma Mia! På Svenska
 2008: Mamma Mia! – The Movie Soundtrack
 2009: Chess in Concert (London)
 2010: Kristina at Carnegie Hall
 2013: Hjälp Sökes

Gemini 
 1985: Gemini
 1987: Geminism

Josefin Nilsson 
 1993: Shapes

See also 
List of Swedes in music
Abbacadabra

References

External links 
 
 

1945 births
Living people
Musicians from Gothenburg
ABBA members
Litteris et Artibus recipients
Swedish composers
Swedish male composers
Swedish humanists
Swedish musical theatre composers
Swedish songwriters
Swedish guitarists
Male guitarists
Eurovision Song Contest winners
Ivor Novello Award winners
Eurodisco musicians
Swedish expatriates in the United Kingdom
Swedish rock guitarists
Swedish mandolinists
Banjoists
Acoustic guitarists
Swedish atheists
Swedish agnostics
Swedish lyricists
Swedish pop singers
Swedish male singers
Swedish rock singers